Mount Olševa (German Ouschewa) is a ridge mountain in the eastern part of the Karawanks near the border with Austria. The mountain separates Carinthia from Styria. Other peaks along the  ridge are Obel kamen on the western side, and Smooth Peak (Gladki vrh) and Pretty Peak (Lepi vrh) on the eastern part.

Routes
2¼ hrs from Podolševa (difficult marked route)
3 hrs from the lower ridge (Spodnje sleme; easy marked route)
3¾ hrs from the Firšt Inn (Gostišče Firšt; somewhat demanding marked route) 
1¾ hrs from Upper Meadow (Zadnji travnik; easy marked route)

References

 Slovenska planinska pot, Planinski vodnik, PZS, 2012, Milenko Arnejšek - Prle, Andraž Poljanec

External links
 
 Route, Description, & Photos
 Stalna razstava Potočka zijalka (Potok Cave Permanent Display) (slo)

Mountains of Carinthia (Slovenia)
Mountains of Styria (Slovenia)
Karawanks
Mountains of the Alps
One-thousanders of Slovenia
Ridges of Slovenia